The prime constant is the real number  whose th binary digit is 1 if  is prime and 0 if  is composite or 1.

In other words,  is the number whose binary expansion corresponds to the indicator function of the set of prime numbers.  That is,

The beginning of the decimal expansion of ρ is:  

The beginning of the binary expansion is:

Irrationality
The number  can be shown to be irrational.  To see why, suppose it were rational.

Then since  is assumed rational, its binary expansion is eventually periodic, and so there exist positive integers  and  such that
 for all  and all .

Since there are an infinite number of primes, we may choose a prime .  By definition we see that .  As noted, we have  for all .  Now consider the case .  We have , since  is composite because .  Since  we see that  is irrational.

References

External links
 

Irrational numbers
Prime numbers
Articles containing proofs
Mathematical constants